An osprey is a medium-large fish-eating bird of prey. There are two species:
 Eastern osprey Pandion cristatus, found in Australia
 Western osprey Pandion haliaetus, found across the Old and New World

Osprey may also refer to:

Astronomy 

 Ospery, one of four formally named regions on the asteroid 101955 Bennu, as mapped by the OSIRIS-REx spacecraft

Businesses
 Osprey Media, a Canadian publishing group of daily and weekly newspapers and specialty publications
 Osprey Packs, an American outdoor backpack brand
 Osprey Publishing, a British publishing company that specializes in books on military history and military equipment
 Sandvik Osprey, a British metallurgical company

Geography
 Osprey, Florida, a town in the United States

Military
 Operation Osprey, an unimplemented German plan in World War II
 Bell Boeing V-22 Osprey, a tiltrotor aircraft in use by the US armed forces

Sports
 Ospreys (rugby union), a Welsh rugby union team that plays its home matches in Swansea, Wales
 Missoula Osprey, a minor league baseball team in Missoula, Montana
 North Florida Ospreys, the athletic teams of the University of North Florida

Technology
 Osprey body armour, a body armour system used by the British military
 Osprey process, a spray forming process owned by Sandvik Osprey

Transportation

Aircraft
(Chronological)
 Hawker Osprey (from 1932), the navalised carrier-borne version of the Hawker Hart biplane
 Fairchild SD-5 Osprey, (from 1960) American reconnaissance drone
 Osprey Osprey I (from 1970), Sport flying boat
 Osprey Osprey 2 (from 1973), Sport amphibian
 Monaghan Osprey (from 1973), glider
 Osprey GP-4 (from 1984), a low-wing retractable gear aircraft of wood construction 
 Osprey GP-5 (late 1980's), a racing airplane designed by George Pereira 
 Paraplane PSE-2 Osprey (from 1990s), an American powered parachute design
 Bell Boeing V-22 Osprey (from 1989), tiltrotor aircraft manufactured by Bell Helicopter Textron and Boeing

Locomotives
 LNER Class A4 4488 Union of South Africa steam locomotive, briefly renamed "Osprey" during a period in the 1980s and early 1990s
 Osprey, the name carried by LNER Peppercorn Class A1 locomotive 60131 from its entry into service in October 1948 until its withdrawal in October 1965

Ships
 , five ships and a shore establishment of the British Royal Navy
 USFS Osprey, a U.S. Bureau of Fisheries fishery patrol vessel in commission from 1913 to 1921
 , several ships of the United States Navy
 , a United States Navy patrol boat in commission from 1917 to 1918
 Osprey class coastal minehunter, a class of United States Navy minehunting vessels

Video games
 Osprey, a cruiser class ship from the MMORPG Eve Online
 Osprey Gunner, a kill streak from the FPS Call of Duty: Modern Warfare 3